Rudimar Venâncio (born 25 January 1984) commonly known as Xapa, is a Brazilian professional Futsal player.

Club career

Chonburi Blue Wave
Thailand Futsal League
Winners (4) 2012–2013,2014,2015,2016
Thai FA Cup
Winners (1) 2015

AFC Futsal Club Championship
Winners (2): 2013,2017

Giti Pasand
AFC Futsal Club Championship
Winners (1): 2012

References

Brazilian men's futsal players
1984 births
Living people
Giti Pasand FSC players
Sportspeople from Santa Catarina (state)
Shahrdari Saveh FSC players